Janówek  is a village in the administrative district of Gmina Pacyna, within Gostynin County, Masovian Voivodeship, in east-central Poland.

The village has a population of approximately 149.

References

Villages in Gostynin County